Perkele are a Swedish rock band from Göteborg best known for their former Oi! sound. Following decades of activity and sold-out shows across major European cities and the US, some have dubbed Perkele one of Europe's biggest punk rock bands and an important part of the genre's evolution. Their sound has been described as punk with '70s/'80s heavy metal influences and elements of blues, jazz, and even classical music.

They have been featured several times in the Maximum Rocknroll zine and were hosted by FC St. Pauli in 2003. Then lead vocalist and frontman of Booze & Glory, Mark Boozer, named Perkele as one of his top 10 favourite Oi! bands. The band members actually started out as punks drawing some inspiration from Swedish folk music, but gradually the Oi! and street punk genres started having a greater influence on their development and around 1997/1998 Perkele became skinheads.

Despite their Swedish origin, perkele—the noun used for the band's name—is, in fact, a Finnish profanity. In a 2003 interview, lead vocalist and founding member Ron Halinoja cited his "roots in Finland" and the word's expressively vulgar nature as the main reasons behind choosing this for the band's name. Perkele claim to be strongly against all kinds of racism, nationalism, fascism, sexism, and homophobia as well as being opposed to hate, war, and environmental pollution. Despite this, in the past their appearance at traditionally left-wing events has caused controversy due to some of their songs featuring lyrical themes of Swedish and Finnish nationalist sentiments. Due to the background of their bassist Chris as an adoptee originally from Sri Lanka, the band have at one point experienced racist abuse from the audience at a concert in Belgium.

In late October 2019, in coordination with the event organisers Perkele cancelled their scheduled performance in Warsaw with over two weeks' notice, citing "low ticket sales" as the primary reason. This caused a backlash from some of their fans, who questioned the band's motivations and criticised their profit-focused approach to music. Perkele replied to this by saying that they are no longer interested in "trying to be punk", causing more controversy among sections of their fanbase. However, the band eventually clarified their stance and issued an apology for cancelling the concert.

Band members
Since Perkele's formation in 1993, the band's line-up underwent various changes up until 1998. After 1998, the band's members remained the same well into the 2000s. Eventually John Sandberg replaced Jonsson on the drum kit.

Current members
Ron Halinoja – vocals, guitar
Christopher Anthony – bass guitar, vocals
Jouni Haapala – drums

Former members
Anders – guitar
Olof – bass guitar
Jonsson – drums
John Sandberg – drums

Discography
Det Växande Hatet (1994)
Från Flykt Till Kamp (1998)
Voice Of Anger (2001)
No Shame (2002)
Göteborg (2003)
Stories From The Past (2004)
Confront (2005)
Songs For You – Live in Magdeburg (2008)
Längtan (2008)
Forever (2010)
Punk Rock Army (2010)
A Way Out (2013)
Leaders Of Tomorrow (2019)

References

External links

Perkele on Last.fm
Perkele on MySpace

Swedish punk rock groups
Oi! groups
1993 establishments in Sweden
Music controversies
Controversies in Sweden